Donald R. Seibert (January 31, 1922 – December 9, 2003) was an American football coach. He was the 29th head football coach at Dickinson College in Carlisle, Pennsylvania, serving for eight seasons, from 1957 to 1964, and compiling a record of 23–39–1.

References

External links
 

1922 births
2003 deaths
American football fullbacks
Dickinson Red Devils football coaches
George Washington Colonials football players
People from Hanover, Pennsylvania